The Universe of Geoffrey Brown is the fourth solo album and first concept album by Captain Sensible, released in April 1993 by Humbug Records.

Background 

Captain Sensible had grown up musically in the 1960s and 1970s, where "some incredible records were being made", he said in 2014. "The first time I heard The Pretty Things’ S.F. Sorrow, I was transfixed. The concept nature of the album took me on a musical journey…a mind trip, even. It was hugely engrossing, and I started seeking out other records of this kind – like The Moody Blues‘ Days of Future Passed and Tommy. "One day I will make an album like this," I promised myself. And that’s how Geoffrey Brown came about."

The album tells the story of Geoffrey Brown, whose quiet corporate life is turned upside down when aliens start leaving warning messages on his computer screen about mankind's self-inflicted demise. He is abandoned as a crackpot by his wife, co-workers and friends only for the government to recognize his value in the end. Sensible: "My main character Geoffrey works at the Ministry of Defence, plotting targets for destruction in a nuclear attack. He considers his job normal until his head is turned by a hippie chick one day on a bicycle ride; he decides to do something more creative with his department’s missile tracking technology."

Captain Sensible came up with the original concept which was condensed into the title track by co-writer Martin Newell. "Originally, it was only one song", Newell explained in 2011. "And then Captain being Captain, said, "Do you think we can make a whole album?" And I said, "We’ve already said it all in one song!" So then we had to pad it out. And then Captain said, "We need some dialogue." Newell brought the characters to life with some "excellent scripts", according to Sensible, "and we got proper actors to perform the between-song dialogue." or Sensible took his inspiration from what he calls "the Cold War rhetoric of Reagan and Thatcher." Sensible: "The question the album asks is, "How did we go from the beautiful love and peace dream of the summer of ’67 to public acceptance of the Dr. Strangelove world of mutually assured nuclear annihilation?" The opening line about aliens being alien that introduces the first track is spoken by real life UFO investigator Jenny Randles.

In his book The Damned - The Chaos Years: An Unofficial Biography, writer Barry Hutchinson describes the music as a "bright, happy collection of English pop, with some leanings to rock and psychedelia in places."

Critical reception 

In a review for AllMusic, Jack Rabid wrote that all of Sensible's  "usual goofy, nostalgic neo-psychedelic guitar tricks and surprisingly crafted pop tunes are in place", adding that "such glitzy tunes as "Holiday in My Heart," "Street of Shame," and the title track claw their way into your affections in a few plays." Rabid felt that the album combines two common Sensible themes: "our own self-destructive impulses and the ostracizing of folks who go against accepted practices and actually dare to use their own brains". He concluded that the album is "another ambitious yet modest gem from a true personality original."

Track listing

Personnel 
Credits adapted from the album's liner notes.

Captain Sensible - vocals, instruments
Martin Newell - drama sequence script, backing vocals (4, 11)
Mel Galley - lead guitar (1)
Nigel Haslem - keyboards (4)
Martin Wilson - drums (4), gong (11)
Rachel Bor - cello (1), backing vocals (6, 8)
Simon The Bald Breakfast Chef - percussion (3)
Paul Bevoir - backing vocals (1)
Lis Aitken - backing vocals (2)
Fi Potsides - backing vocals (2)
Ezee Studios staff - chorus vocals (2)
Wee Dave Shaw - backing vocals (4, 11)
Pisshead Pam - sexy voice (11)
Binky Baker - Geoffrey Brown 	 
Judy Buxton - other parts 	 
James Kerry - other parts
Production
Captain Sensible - producer, arrangement
Andy Lovell - engineer
Rose Petalmetal - vocal tracking (2)
John Harris - engineer (Old Pink Dog Studios)
Nik Smith - engineer (Old Pink Dog Studios)
Andy Reilly - MIDI programming
Sid Wells - digital editing, mastering
Sam Steiger - sleeve design
Shane McCarthy - photography
All speech recorded at Old Pink Dog Studios, Sussex

References 

1993 albums
Captain Sensible albums
Concept albums